Grant Andrew Decouto (born 24 March 1995), professionally known as Deko, is an American rapper and music producer. He is best known for producing OG Maco's "Want More" and Migos' single "One Time". He has also worked with Gucci Mane, K Camp, and, as part of the EDM trio Merge, with OG Parker and Tee Romano. Deko has also collaborated with visual artist Osean to create Yameii Online. Yameii Online is a Vocaloid virtual rapper featured in some of his music.

Certification
"Slippery" by Migos – certified gold by RIAA.

Production discography

Discography

Studio albums

References

Record producers from Georgia (U.S. state)
1995 births
Living people